Columbus High School is a public high school located in Columbus, Texas (USA) and classified as a 3A school by the UIL. It is part of the Columbus Independent School District located in central Colorado County. In 2015, the school was rated "Met Standard" by the Texas Education Agency.

Athletics
The Columbus Cardinals compete in the following sports:

 Baseball
 Basketball
 Cross country
 Football
 Golf
 Powerlifting
 Softball
 Swimming and diving
 Tennis
 Track and field
 Volleyball
 Soccer
 Wheelchair basketball

State titles
Boys Golf: 1961 (2A), 2019(3A)
Girls Golf: 1976 (2A), 1977 (2A), 1978 (2A), 1979 (2A), 1981 (3A), 1983 (3A), 1985 (3A)
Boys Track: 1976 (2A), 1986 (3A)
Girls Track: 1991 (3A)

References

External links
Columbus ISD

Schools in Colorado County, Texas
Public high schools in Texas